The Frenchman's Garden Murders were a series of 6 murders that were perpetrated in the town of Peñaflor, Province of Seville, Spain, up to 1904. The crimes were committed by Andrés Aldije Monmejá, known as El Francés for being a native of Agen, France, and José Muñoz Lopera. Both men had set up an illegal gambling house, robbing and murdering some of the visitors. After being condemned to the death penalty, both were executed by garrote on October 31, 1906 in the Pópulo Prison of Seville. Based on these facts, the film director Paul Naschy made a film titled The Frenchman's Garden in 1977.

References 

1904 murders in Spain
1900s murders in Spain
Criminal duos
Executed French serial killers
Executed Spanish serial killers
Male serial killers
People murdered in Spain